Allen D. Nease High School is a high school in the St. Johns County School District, located in the Nocatee census-designated place (with a Ponte Vedra, Florida postal address), in St. Johns County, Florida. It is a part of the St. Johns County School District.

It was established in 1981. The school is a member of the International Baccalaureate program. The principal is Lisa Kunze.

Communities in the school's attendance boundary include: the majority of Nocatee CDP.

Namesake
Nease High School is named after Allen Nease, a pioneer in Florida's reforestation efforts, and donor of the land on which the school was built. Nease also served on the St. Johns County School Board for 24 years, 17 of which as chairman.

History
Growth in the northeast corner of St. Johns County, primarily in the Ponte Vedra Beach/Palm Valley areas during the 1970s had warranted the construction of a new school. The school, which opened in 1984, is the second public high school built in St. Johns County. The school first opened as a Junior/Senior High School, but as the growth of Northwest St. Johns County rose the school eliminated its Junior high sector. Nease was originally designed to accommodate up to 1,500 students, however, enrollment has historically been at above capacity. Bartram Trail High School opened in the Fall of 2000 to alleviate overcrowding. Due to the continual growth in Northwest St. Johns County area, Ponte Vedra High School was built and opened in the Fall of 2008. Tocoi Creek High School opened in Fall 2021 to serve students residing in the World Golf Village area.

From the 2021-22 school year, Allen D. Nease Senior High School is zoned to serve the communities of Nocatee, Ponte Vedra, Palencia, Kensington and Las Calinas. The main feeder schools are Palm Valley Academy, Valley Ridge Academy and Pine Island Academy. Other students come from Pacetti Bay Middle School, Alice B. Landrum Middle School or Fruit Cove Middle School.

Academics
Nease High School was rated the 81st best high school in 2007, 91st in 2008, 93rd in 2009, and 185th in 2010 by Newsweek. Nease High School ranked 977th in the U.S. News & World Report 2018 list of best public high schools in America.

Nease High School has the International Baccalaureate Program (IB), as well as the Advanced Placement Program.

Athletics
Nease competes in FHSAA Class 8A as the Panthers wearing the colors green and gold.  The Panthers field teams in the following sports:

Baseball (boys)
Boys state champion - 2017 (7A)
Basketball (girls & boys)
State champion - 2002 (3A)
Girls state champion - 1999 (5A)
Competitive cheer (girls)
Cross country (girls & boys)
Football (boys)
State champion - 2005 (4A)
Golf (girls & boys)
Boys state champion - 1995 (4A), 1996 (6A), 1998 (6A), 2000 (2A), 2001 (A) and 2007 (2A). Six titles is the most of any school in Florida.
Lacrosse (girls & boys)
Soccer (girls & boys)
Girls state champion - 2002 (2A), 2005 (4A), 2006 (4A) and 2008 (4A)
Boys state champion - 2007 and 2008 (4A)
Swimming (girls & boys)
Tennis (girls & boys)
4A Track & field (girls & boys)
2021 FHSAA Runner up
Volleyball (girls)
State champion - 2008 (4A)
Weightlifting (girls & boys)
Wrestling (boys)

Notable alumni
Tim Tebow, did not attend (home schooled) played sports only, 2007 Heisman Trophy winner, professional football and baseball player
Len Mattiace, professional golfer
Jeff Klauk, professional golfer
Ben Nowland, professional arena football player (Grand Rapids Rampage)
Nathan Sturgis, professional soccer player (Houston Dynamo)
Victoria Crawford, former WWE Divas Champion known as Alicia Fox
Mario Butler, professional football player
Brodie Smith, professional disc golf player, YouTuber and professional ultimate frisbee player
Samuel Shaw, professional wrestler known as Dexter Lumis in WWE

References

External links
Nease High School
St. Johns County School District

Educational institutions established in 1981
High schools in St. Johns County, Florida
Public high schools in Florida
1981 establishments in Florida